Operation Gold Ingot is a 1962 French-Italian heist film directed by Georges Lautner and starring Martine Carol. It is based on a novel by M.G. Braun.

Plot

Cast  

 Martine Carol as Kathy
 Francis Blanche as  Commissioner Camille Fellous
 Félix Marten  as Félix
 Alberto Lionello as  René
 Nico Pepe  as Sforza
 Yves Barsacq  as  le gangster
 Pierre Barouh as René
 Henri Cogan  as  un truand
 Ida Stuart  as  Gilda
 Bernard Blier 
 Gaia Germani

References

External links

Operation Gold Ingot at Variety Distribution

French crime thriller films
Italian crime thriller films
1960s crime thriller films
1960s thriller films
Films directed by Georges Lautner
1960s French films
1960s Italian films